is a Japanese former actress and gravure idol from Fukuoka, Fukuoka. She retired from the entertainment industry in August 2019.

Filmography

Movie roles
 Emiko Okamura (Alto Saxophone) in Swing Girls (2004)
 OneChanbara (film) (2008)

TV roles
 Natsuki Mamiya (BoukenYellow) in GoGo Sentai Boukenger (2006).
 Matsushiro Hikaru in Mei-chan no Shitsuji (2009).

Anime roles
 Dragonaut -The Resonance- (2007)
 Penguin Musume Heart (2008)
 Shikabane Hime (2008)

References

1986 births
Living people
Japanese gravure idols
Japanese female models
Japanese actresses
Japanese television personalities
People from Fukuoka
Musicians from Fukuoka Prefecture